Epimedium pinnatum is a species of flowering plant in the barberry family Berberidaceae, native to northern Iran.

The Latin specific epithet pinnatum means “with leaves growing on either side of the stalk”. 

The subspecies E. pinnatum subsp. colchicum has gained the Royal Horticultural Society’s Award of Garden Merit. It is best grown in moist, fertile soil in a sheltered, partially-shaded spot, and is suitable for underplanting shrubs and trees.

References

pinnatum